Breitenbrunn may refer to:

Breitenbrunn, Austria, in Burgenland, Austria
Breitenbrunn, Upper Palatinate, in the district of Neumarkt, Bavaria, Germany
Breitenbrunn, Swabia, in the district of Unterallgäu, Bavaria, Germany
Breitenbrunn, Saxony, in the district of Aue-Schwarzenberg, Saxony, Germany